This is a list of museums in Taiwan, including cultural centers and arts centres.

Kaohsiung City

 Chung Li-he Museum
 Cijin Shell Museum
 Fongshan Community Culture Museum
 Former British Consulate at Takao
 Hamasen Museum of Taiwan Railway
 Jiasian Petrified Fossil Museum
 Kaohsiung Astronomical Museum
 Kaohsiung Hakka Cultural Museum
 Kaohsiung Harbor Museum
 Kaohsiung Museum of Fine Arts
 Kaohsiung Museum of Fisheries Civilization
 Kaohsiung Museum of History
 Kaohsiung Museum of Labor
 Kaohsiung Vision Museum
 Meinong Hakka Culture Museum
 National Science and Technology Museum
 Republic of China Air Force Museum
 Soya-Mixed Meat Museum
 Taiwan Pineapple Museum
 Taiwan Sugar Museum
 Takao Railway Museum
 Xiaolin Pingpu Cultural Museum
 YM Museum of Marine Exploration Kaohsiung
 War and Peace Memorial Park and Theme Hall

New Taipei City

 Fort San Domingo
 Jingtong Mining Industry Museum
 Ju Ming Museum
 Li Tien-lu Hand Puppet Historical Museum
 Museum of World Religions
 National Human Rights Museum (Jing-Mei White Terror Memorial Park)
 New Taipei City Gold Museum
 New Taipei City Hakka Museum
 New Taipei City Yingge Ceramics Museum
 Ping-Lin Tea Museum
 Sanxia History Museum
 Shihsanhang Museum of Archaeology
 Taiwan Coal Mine Museum
 Taiwan Nougat Creativity Museum
 Tamkang University Maritime Museum
 Tamsui Historical Museum
 Teng Feng Fish Ball Museum
 Wulai Atayal Museum
 Wulai Forestry Life Museum

Taichung City

 921 Earthquake Museum of Taiwan
 Asia Museum of Modern Art
 Assembly Affairs Museum, The Legislative Yuan
 Chang Hwa Bank Headquarters and Museum
 Chang Lien-cheng Saxophone Museum
 Chengkungling History Museum
 Fengyuan Museum of Lacquer Art
 Lin Hsien-tang Residence Museum
 Ling Tung Numismatic Museum
 Lishan Culture Museum
 National Museum of Natural Science
 National Taiwan Museum of Fine Arts
 Taichung English and Art Museum
 Taichung Literature Museum
 Taichung Military Kindred Village Museum
 Taiwan Balloons Museum
 Tuniu Hakka Cultural Museum

Tainan City

 Bo Yang Museum
 Canal Museum
 Chimei Museum
 Fangyuan Museum of Arts
 Former Tait & Co. Merchant House
 Fort Zeelandia Museum
 Furniture Manufacturing Eco Museum in Tainan
 Hilltop Garden Watercourse Museum
 Liu Chi-hsiang Art Gallery and Memorial Hall
 Luerhmen History and Culture Museum
 Museum of Archaeology, Tainan Branch of National Museum of Prehistory
 National Cheng Kung University Museum
 National Museum of Taiwan History
 National Museum of Taiwan Literature
 Tainan Art Museum
 Tainan Children's Science Museum
 Tainan Judicial Museum
 Taiwan Metal Creation Museum
 Taiwan Salt Museum
 Taiwan Sugar Museum
 Yang Kui Literature Memorial Museum

Taipei City

 Ama Museum
 Aurora Art Museum
 Beitou Hot Spring Museum
 Beitou Museum
 Beitou Plum Garden
 Chang Foundation Museum
 Cheng Nan-jung Liberty Museum
 Chiang Kai-shek Memorial Hall
 Children's Art Museum in Taipei
 Chunghwa Postal Museum
 Customs Museum
 Evergreen Maritime Museum
 Fire Safety Museum of Taipei City Fire Department
 Hong-Gah Museum
 Hwa Kang Museum
 Insect Science Museum
 Jut Art Museum
 Kuandu Museum of Fine Arts
 Kuo Yuan Ye Museum of Cake and Pastry
 Land Reform Museum
 Lin An Tai Historical House and Museum
 Lingnan Fine Arts Museum
 Miniatures Museum of Taiwan
 Museum of Anthropology
 Museum of Contemporary Art Taipei
 Museum of Drinking Water
 Museum of Jade Art
 Museum of Medical Humanities
 Museum of Zoology
 National 228 Memorial Museum
 National Museum of History
 National Palace Museum
 National Taiwan Museum
 National Taiwan University Archives
 Presidential and Vice-Presidential Artifacts Museum
 Republic of China Armed Forces Museum
 Shung Ye Museum of Formosan Aborigines
 Suho Memorial Paper Museum
 Sun Yat-sen Memorial Hall
 Sun Yun-suan Memorial Museum
 Taipei 228 Memorial Museum
 Taipei Astronomical Museum
 Taipei City Museum
 Taipei Fine Arts Museum
 Taipei Story House
 Taiwan Design Museum
 Taiwan Stock Museum
 Tittot Glass Art Museum
 Zhongshan Hall

Taoyuan City

 Action Museum
 Arwin Charisma Museum
 Chinese Furniture Museum
 Chung Cheng Aviation Museum
 Coca-Cola Museum
 Formosa Plastics Group Museum
 HeySong Beverage Museum
 Kuo Yuan Ye Museum of Cake and Pastry
 Mei-hwa Spinning Top Museum
 Republic of Chocolate
 Taiwan High Speed Rail Museum
 World Police Museum

Chiayi City
 Chiayi Art Museum
 Chiayi Municipal Museum
 Chiayi Prison Museum
 Museum of Old Taiwan Tiles
 Taiwan Hinoki Museum

Hsinchu City

 Aqueduct Museum of Hsinchu City
 Black Bat Squadron Memorial Hall
 Glass Museum of Hsinchu City
 Hsinchu City Fire Museum
 Hsinchu Museum of Military Dependents Village
 Image Museum of Hsinchu City
 Museum of National Chiao Tung University

Keelung City
 National Museum of Marine Science and Technology
 YM Oceanic Culture and Art Museum

Changhua County
 BRAND'S Health Museum
 Changhua County Art Museum
 Lukang Folk Arts Museum

Chiayi County

 1913 Antique Office of Alishan House-Local Cultural Building
 Alishan Museum
 Mei-Ling Fine Arts Museum
 National Radio Museum
 Ping Huang Coffee Museum
 Southern Branch of the National Palace Museum

Hsinchu County
 Liu Hsing-chin Comic Museum
 Rueylong Museum

Hualien County
 Chihsing Tan Katsuo Museum
 Hualien County Stone Sculptural Museum

Kinmen County

 August 23 Artillery Battle Museum
 Guningtou Battle Museum
 Hujingtou Battle Museum
 Kinmen Ceramics Museum
 Landmine Museum
 Lieyu Township Culture Museum
 Yu Da Wei Xian Sheng Memorial Museum

Lienchiang County
 Matsu Blue Tears Ecological Museum
 Matsu Folk Culture Museum

Miaoli County

 Huoyan Mountain Ecology Museum
 Miaoli Ceramics Museum
 Miaoli Railway Museum
 Museum of Saisiyat Folklore
 Sanyi Wood Sculpture Museum
 Shengxing Station
 Taiwan Oil Field Exhibition Hall
 Zaochiao Charcoal Museum

Nantou County
 Muh Sheng Museum of Entomology
 Taiwan Mochi Museum
 Taiwan Times Village
 Yu-hsiu Museum of Art

Penghu County
 Chang Yu-sheng Memorial Museum
 Chuwan Crab Museum
 Ocean Resources Museum
 Penghu Living Museum

Pingtung County
 Museum of Traditional Theater
 National Museum of Marine Biology and Aquarium
 Pingtung Art Museum
 Pingtung Hakka Cultural Museum

Taitung County

 Bunun Cultural Museum
 Lanyu Flying Fish Cultural Museum
 National Human Rights Museum (Green Island White Terror Memorial Park)
 National Museum of Prehistory
 Rice Village Museum
 Taitung Art Museum
 Taitung County Museum of Natural History
 Taitung Story Museum
 Wu Tao Chishang Lunch Box Cultural History Museum

Yilan County

 Atayal Life Museum
 Beneficial Microbes Museum and Tourism Factory
 Coral Museum
 Lanyang Museum
 Lee Rong-chun Literary Museum
 National Center for Traditional Arts
 Spring Onion Culture Museum
 Taiwan Theater Museum
 Yilan Distillery Chia Chi Lan Wine Museum
 Yilan Literary Museum
 Zhu Dayu Culture Museum

Yunlin County
 Farming and Irrigation Artifacts Museum
 Honey Museum
 Soy Sauce Brewing Museum
 Yunlin Hand Puppet Museum
 Yunlin Story House

Closed museums
 Children's Museum of Taipei
 Chung Cheng Aviation Museum
 Taiyuan Asian Puppet Theatre Museum

See also
 Chinese Association of Museums
 Culture of Taiwan
 List of museums
 List of tourist attractions in Taiwan
 Tourism in Taiwan

References

External links

 Taiwan Museum 
 Local Cultural Museum 

 
Museums
Taiwan
Museums
Taiwan
Museums